The following is a partial list of the "F" codes for Medical Subject Headings (MeSH), as defined by the United States National Library of Medicine (NLM).

This list continues the information at List of MeSH codes (F01). Codes following these are found at List of MeSH codes (F03). For other MeSH codes, see List of MeSH codes.

The source for this content is the set of 2006 MeSH Trees from the NLM.

– psychological phenomena and processes

– mental competency

– mental health

– mental processes
  – cognition
  – awareness
  – cognitive dissonance
  – comprehension (understanding)
  – consciousness
  – imagination
  – dreams
  – fantasy
  – intuition
  – intention
  – learning
  – association
  – association learning
  – avoidance learning
  – conditioning (psychology)
  – automatic behavior
  – conditioning, classical
  – conditioning, eyelid
  – conditioning, operant
  – critical period (psychology)
  – cues
  – discrimination learning
  – generalization (psychology)
  – generalization, response
  – generalization, stimulus
  – habituation (psychophysiology)
  – helplessness, learned
  – imprinting (psychology)
  – inhibition (psychology)
  – proactive inhibition
  – reactive inhibition
  – maze learning
  – memory
  – deja vu
  – memory, short-term
  – mental recall
  – recognition (psychology)
  – retention (psychology)
  – neurolinguistic programming
  – overlearning
  – practice (psychology)
  – probability learning
  – problem-based learning
  – problem solving
  – reinforcement (psychology)
  – extinction (psychology)
  – knowledge of results (psychology)
  – punishment
  – reinforcement schedule
  – reinforcement, social
  – reinforcement, verbal
  – reward
  – token economy
  – reversal learning
  – set (psychology)
  – transfer (psychology)
  – verbal learning
  – paired-associate learning
  – serial learning
  – mental fatigue
  – mind-body relations (metaphysics)
  – perception
  – auditory perception
  – auditory threshold
  – auditory fatigue
  – loudness perception
  – perceptual masking
  – pitch perception
  – pitch discrimination
  – sound localization
  – speech perception
  – body image
  – depth perception
  – distance perception
  – differential threshold
  – discrimination (psychology)
  – signal detection (psychology)
  – eidetic imagery
  – field dependence-independence
  – form perception
  – stereognosis
  – gravity perception
  – illusions
  – optical illusions
  – pattern recognition, physiological
  – pattern recognition, visual
  – perceptual distortion
  – sensory deprivation
  – sensory thresholds
  – auditory threshold
  – differential threshold
  – pain threshold
  – signal detection (psychology)
  – subliminal stimulation
  – taste threshold
  – size perception
  – social perception
  – space perception
  – time perception
  – touch
  – stereognosis
  – visual perception
  – afterimage
  – color perception
  – field dependence-independence
  – figural aftereffect
  – flicker fusion
  – motion perception
  – pattern recognition, visual
  – perceptual closure
  – perceptual masking
  – space perception
  – depth perception
  – distance perception
  – vision disparity
  – form perception
  – contrast sensitivity
  – pattern recognition, visual
  – size perception
  – weight perception
  – thinking
  – concept formation
  – creativeness
  – decision making
  – choice behavior
  – career choice
  – consensus
  – dissent and disputes
  – refusal to participate
  – negotiating
  – uncertainty
  – esthetics
  – beauty
  – judgment
  – problem solving
  – volition

– personal autonomy

– parapsychology
  – telepathy

– psycholinguistics
  – neurolinguistic programming
  – semantic differential

– psychological theory
  – behaviorism
  – existentialism
  – gestalt theory
  – personal construct theory
  – psychoanalytic theory
  – ego
  – reality testing
  – extraversion (psychology)
  – freudian theory
  – id
  – inhibition (psychology)
  – introversion (psychology)
  – jungian theory
  – libido
  – narcissism
  – object attachment
  – bonding, human-pet
  – oedipus complex
  – pleasure-pain principle
  – psychosexual development
  – gender identity
  – latency period (psychology)
  – oral stage
  – self psychology
  – superego
  – unconscious (psychology)

– psychology, applied
  – counseling
  – directive counseling
  – pastoral care
  – sex counseling
  – criminal psychology
  – lie detection
  – human engineering
  – data display
  – man-machine systems
  – task performance and analysis
  – time and motion studies
  – work simplification
  – time management
  – psychology, educational
  – achievement
  – aptitude
  – aspirations (psychology)
  – child, exceptional
  – child, gifted
  – child guidance
  – education of mentally retarded
  – learning
  – neurolinguistic programming
  – remedial teaching
  – student dropouts
  – underachievement
  – vocational guidance
  – psychology, industrial
  – absenteeism
  – efficiency
  – job satisfaction
  – task performance and analysis
  – time and motion studies
  – work simplification
  – time management
  – vocational guidance
  – psychology, military

– psychomotor performance
  – motor skills
  – task performance and analysis

– psychophysiology
  – appetite
  – arousal
  – attention
  – wakefulness
  – biofeedback (psychology)
  – blushing
  – consciousness
  – dominance, cerebral
  – laterality
  – habituation (psychophysiology)
  – lie detection
  – orientation
  – kinesis
  – reaction time
  – refractory period, psychological
  – reflex
  – galvanic skin response
  – piloerection
  – startle reaction
  – satiation
  – satiety response
  – self stimulation
  – sensation
  – hearing
  – pain
  – arthralgia
  – pain threshold
  – proprioception
  – kinesthesis
  – smell
  – taste
  – temperature sense
  – touch
  – vision
  – phosphenes
  – vision, entoptic
  – sleep
  – dreams
  – sleep deprivation
  – sleep stages
  – sleep, rem
  – stress, psychological
  – burnout, professional

– religion and psychology
  – pastoral care
  – spirituality

The list continues at List of MeSH codes (F03).

F02